Doracium, was an ancient town of Illyricum, which Hierocles calls the metropolis of the Provincia Praevalitana – a title which rightly belongs to Scodra. Wesseling has supposed that it might represent Dioclea, but this is not confirmed. Its precise location is not known.

References

Roman towns and cities in Montenegro
Former populated places in the Balkans
Cities in ancient Illyria
Illyrian Montenegro

ca:Doracium